The statue of Athena Parthenos was a monumental chryselephantine sculpture of the goddess Athena. Attributed to Phidias and dated to the mid-fifth century BCE, it was an offering from the city of Athens to Athena, its tutelary deity. The naos of the Parthenon on the acropolis of Athens was designed exclusively to accommodate it.

Many artists and craftsmen worked on the realization of the sculpture, which was probably built around a core of cypress wood, and then paneled with gold and ivory plates. At about 11.50 meters high, the statue reflected the established aesthetic canon of the severe style (clothing) while adopting the innovations of the high classical (leg position). She was helmeted and held a large round shield and spear, placed on the ground to her left, next to her sacred snake. Clothes, jewellery, accessories, and even the statue base were decorated, mainly with the snake and gorgon motif.

The statue was lost at an unknown date sometime in the first millennium. Several replicas and works were inspired by the original.

Parthenon and statue of Athena

In 480 BCE the Persians ransacked the Acropolis of Athens, including the pre-Parthenon, which was under construction at the time. After their victories in Salamis and Plataea, the Athenians had sworn not to complete the destroyed temples but to leave them as they were, in memory of the Persian "barbarism". In the succeeding years, however, Athens grew to control much of the region through its domination of the Delian League, a confederation of Greek states originally designed to protect themselves against the Persians. Within thirty years, the league had evolved into an Athenian powerhouse. By 454 BCE, the Delian treasury had been relocated to Athens, where the money was funnelled into an ambitious plan to rebuild the city and its destroyed temples, including the Parthenon.

The new Parthenon was erected between 447 and 438 BCE. Pericles chose the sculptor Phidias to supervise the building program with the architects Ictinos and Kallikrates. The sekos (closed part surrounded by the peristyle) was divided into two rooms. The small one to the west, the "Parthenon" itself (the "virgin room"), housed the treasure of the League of Delos and other offerings. To the east, the "hecatompedos neos" housed the statue of Athena Parthenos. The room was 29.90 m long, or around one hundred Athenian feet, by 19 m wide, with a ceiling height of 12.50 m.

The new building was not intended to become a temple, but a treasury meant to house the colossal chryselephantine statue of Athena Parthenos. It is even likely that the statue project preceded the building project. This was an offering from the city to the goddess, but not a statue of worship: there was no priestess of Athena Parthenos. 

Primary ancient sources about the statue are writings by Pausanias and Pliny the Elder. Pausanias is also the originator of the surname "Parthenos." Early writings mentioned "the statue," "the statue of Athena," "the golden statue of Athena," "the ivory statue of Athena," or simply "the Athena." Since at least the end of the fifth century BCE, however, the patron goddess of the Parthenon has been known as "Athena Parthenos."

Construction

According to Pausanias and Plutarch, the statue is not by Phidias alone but of a team of craftsmen representing several trades, Phidias supervising all the decoration work of the Parthenon. The location of the workshop where the statue was made is unknown. It could have been on the acropolis, at the eastern end, under what was later to become the old Acropolis museum. However, given the cost of precious materials (gold and ivory), it could also have been installed elsewhere, at the foot of the sacred rock, far from the comings and goings of the main site and its dust.

The statue was likely made of "spare parts", perhaps first mounted in the workshop, then dismantled, moved to the Parthenon, after its completion, and installed in its final place. The remaining accounts make it possible to estimate the cost of the work at 704 talents, or the equivalent of 200 Triremes (the city's naval power base). However, the statue was considered an ultimate financial reserve, the gold decorating it could be melted down if necessary. According to the various ancient authors, the weight of gold used was between 40 and 50 talents, or between 1 and 1.3 tons of gold. By way of comparison, the annual toll of the "allies" of the League of Delos at the time amounted to 28 talents. On another note, this gold would have represented for the city of Athens more than a year's salary for 10,000 skilled workers, more than a year's pay for 10,000 hoplites or 10,000 rowers in the war fleet. The quantity and cost of ivory are more difficult to determine. It was needed for the face, arms, and feet of the statue, as well as for the gorgon’s head depicted on the goddess's chest. It is less certain that ivory could have been used for the rendering of snake scales. On an inscription of 440-439 BCE there is recorded the purchase of an unknown amount of elephant ivory for the sum of 24 talents and 743 silver drachmas. However, it is difficult to know if this constituted all the necessary material.

The statue was mounted on a rot-proof wooden frame, probably cypress. A decree of the Athenians thanks the people of the Eteocarpathians for providing them with a large quantity of cypress wood. This wood came from a forest dedicated to Apollo and therefore could only be exploited for religious purposes. In the Parthenon's soil is still visible the hole (75.5 cm by 54 cm and 37 cm deep) where the central beam was planted. Around this "mast", a whole frame in the same cypress wood gave shape to the statue. The city had the technique and craftsmen capable of this work with its many marine carpenters. To this reinforcement were fixed, probably nailed, gold plates. It is not possible to know if they had been melted (and the moulds preserved, perhaps in case of repair) or hammered (Sphyrelaton technique). Ivory work was much more difficult, even if the statue of Athena Parthenos was not the first Greek statue to use this imported material. Oppian gives valuable indications of the techniques used. The necessary surfaces (face, arms, and feet) far exceeded the size of elephant tusks. However, these are made up of thin layers of superimposed ivory that can be "unrolled like a roll of papyrus". The next problem was to give shape to these long blades. It was the work of specialists able to soften the material and then mould it. The ivory plates thus created had the flexibility of the wax plates used for moulding bronze statues, a technique that Phidias mastered perfectly. If the gold plates were probably directly nailed to the frame, the more fragile ivory was certainly fixed more delicately with dowels or glued with fish glue. The joints between ivory plates would most certainly have been masked in the drop shadows and by jewellery (bracelets and necklace). The ivory then had to be polished, most often with squatine skins (type of shark). Finally, the ivory was painted: the goddess was "made-up", using red pigment on her cheeks and lips as well as on her nails. It is also very unlikely that the gold was left as is: it would likely have been inlaid with precious and semi-precious stones that reflected the light.

The statue must have been completed in 438 BCE when it was consecrated and installed in the Parthenon. Gold and ivory that had not been used were then offered for sale.

Description

The statue was installed in the main room of the Parthenon to the east. Behind her and on her sides, Doric columns supported the roof and offered her the setting of a canopy. In front of her, a large basin filled with water played several roles: it was used to maintain a sufficient degree of humidity in the room (to conserve ivory) and it also had to reflect the external light and illuminate the work. It was suggested that there could have been windows (probably 3 m high and 2.5 m wide) on each side of the door (9.75 m high and 4.19 m wide) that would have allowed daylight in.

The statue measured, according to Pliny the Elder, 26 cubits (about 11.50 m high), probably counting its base. It thus reached less than one and a half meters from the ceiling. She therefore filled the room with her presence. Phidias' idea was apparently to represent the goddess under her "true" aspect, in all her majesty, beauty, magnificence, or even in her real size, since the gods were considered proportionally much greater than humans.

Only the pedestal of the statue has been preserved. On the front of this base, a carved plaque evoked the birth of Pandora in the presence of twenty gods. It is the only decorative element that has not subsequently been copied and reproduced, so it is unknown in its details. It is not even possible to know if it was made of marble or gilded bronze. The presence of this theme (birth of the first woman, plus fatal woman) is quite difficult to reconcile with the representation of the virgin goddess of wisdom. It was perhaps a symbol of both aspects of femininity, or even the growing role of women in Athens in the fifth century BCE. Other interpretations are proposed. Helios and Selene framed the scene; it is, therefore, possible to see it as a form of calendar. Pandora can also be read as a warning that with the gods, nothing was ever taken for granted. Thus, the triumphant Athens of Pericles mastered modern techniques, just as the first men had mastered fire. They had thus unbalanced the old order and had been punished (with a woman made by Hephaistus, god of fire and techniques). Athens, therefore, had to avoid falling into hubris. More optimistically, Pandora's myth could be a reminder that even deep in the difficulties, hope can always be reborn. Finally, far from Pandora described by Hesiod and quoted by Pausanias to evoke the decoration of the base, there is an Athenian Pandora. She is one of the daughters of Erechtheus, one of the Hyacinthides who sacrificed herself to save the city. She would have had a miraculous birth, of the autochthonic type, and was linked to the goddess Athena, mainly by weaving. Pandora was presented in this Athenian myth as a kourotrophic (child carrier therefore a nurse) and a bearer of benefits. From then on, Joan Connelly proposes to read the scene as the apotheosis of Athenian Pandora, and not as the birth of the "Hesiodic" Pandora.

The Athena wore a half-open peplos on the right side, as was the rule for female representations in the first half of the fifth century BCE. However, her posture was new (in the canon that Polykleitos would then develop for his athlete statues): the left leg was a little bent, the knee forward, the heel not posing on the ground. This posture seems to have been chosen more for technical reasons of balance and volume of the lower manikin than for aesthetic reasons. The bust, on the other hand, does not seem to have been affected by the imbalance of the lower body, it would have been very straight and frontal.

Over her peplos, she bore at the breast the aegis lined with snakes and within its centre, at the level of the solar plexus, an ivory gorgoneion. The goddess' face was also ivory, probably with a neutral expression, as was then the aesthetic rule. However, she may have had her lips ajar, symbolizing the breath of life. Gemstones allowed her eyes to have the Persian colour corresponding to one of Athena's epithets. Long strands of hair escaped from her helmet and descended to the aegis. It was a reinterpretation of the korai hairstyle, the archaic statues of young women abundantly dedicated to the goddess on the acropolis of Athens. The helmet was of the Attic type, with paragnathides (pieces protecting the cheeks) raised and decorated with gryphons. The top of the helmet had three crests: a sphinx in the centre, surrounded on each side by a winged horse. The visor was decorated with protomes. The edge of her sandals ("Etruscan" type), about 20 cm high, was decorated with a painted or carved centauromachy, the sources do not allow a conclusive answer. Her belt was two snakes tied. Athena also wore jewellery: a pendant on each ear, snake-shaped bracelets on each wrist and biceps, and a necklace.

The left hand held her shield and spear. At her feet on the left side, her sacred snake nestled. In her right hand, perhaps leaning on a column to support her, she held a statue of Nike, 2 m high. This symbolization of victory itself held a crown of gold laurels, which she was to be about to place on the goddess's head. The column is present in copies where it is necessary for reasons of the balance of terracotta or marble, but its existence for the original statue remains much discussed. The presence of a column could then explain the fact that Athena's sacred snake was placed to her left (where it partially hid the shield decoration), rather than to her right, its usual place. If this column were present, it could also have been the first example of a Corinthian capital, then developed by the two architects on their temple of Apollo in Bassae.

This was the most visible, therefore the most described and copied decorative element. In the centre was again a gorgoneion that must have looked like the Rondanini Medusa since it is strongly inspired by it. He was surrounded by about thirty fighters. Theseus commanded the Greek troops, so the Athenians. In front of them, Amazons were attacking the Acropolis as indicated by the steep scenery. According to Plutarch, Phidias represented himself among the Athenians, in the centre at the top, as a bald old man preparing to throw the stone held with two hands above his head. He would also have included Pericles, right next to him, on the right, armed with a spear. This gesture, which was criticized for him, is however proof that this relief-carved decoration was indeed by the hand of Phidias himself. The inside of the shield, less visible, was painted with a gigantomachy. The three fights represented on the statue (centauromachy, gigantomachy, and amazonomachy) were also found on the carved decoration of the Parthenon. The southern metopes are decorated with a centauromachy, those in the east with a gigantomachy, and those in the west with an amazonomachy a.

The snake (δράκων), perhaps represented the Chthonian powers that would have been present on the acropolis from the beginning, or even Erichthonios himself whom the goddess had raised on her sacred rock. In fact, the monsters (sphinx, gryphons, winged horses, snakes, and gorgonians) that adorn the statue of the deity symbolize these primitive forces she domesticated.

The themes chosen to decorate this statue, as well as those that adorned the entire building, were part of an iconographic and political program of the celebration of the city through its guardian goddess. Athens, at the height of its power in the time of Pericles, evoked here the victory of (its) civilization over chaos, disorder, hybris, and barbarism in general, even beyond the commemoration of its victory in the Median wars. The virtues and piety of the city were read in its offering to its goddess. Its commercial and naval power materialized in the materials used: gold and ivory, very expensive, from far away.

History

Ivory, a fragile material and subject to desiccation, was maintained with oiled water that was left available in a basin at the foot of the statue. The oil layer left a protective film preventing evaporation and giving shine to the ivory.

The luxury of the statue contrasted with its interior filled, like all chryselephantine statues, with "levers, corners, nails that cross the machine from side to side, ankles, pitch, clay and other things as shocking to the eye, not to mention an infinity of flies or shrews", as Lucian describes in Dream or the Rooster, XXIV.18.

According to sources in 438 BCE. (from the consecration of the statue) or in 432 BCE. (just before the outbreak of the Peloponnesian War), Phidias was accused of diverting part of the precious metals used to make the statue of Athena Parthenos, which was also sacrilege in itself since gold belonged to the goddess. Arrested, he would have escaped, which was interpreted as an admission of guilt. He reportedly fled to Olympia where he made the Chryselephantine statue of Zeus and where he died. For historians, an accusation against Phidias would then have been a way for Pericles' political opponents to attack the archon. Later, between 300 and 295 BCE., the tyrant Lachares allegedly had the gold plates removed to pay his troops. However, the veracity of this gesture is difficult to establish. If Lachares had taken gold permanently, he committed sacrilege. If his gesture was a simple "borrowing" from Athena, the rule was to repay with interest, difficult if the only way to obtain funds was to strip the goddess.

The Parthenon was ravaged by a fire at an indeterminate date in late antiquity, causing serious damage. The roof collapsed. The Doric columns of the naos were replaced by columns from the Hellenistic stoas of the Roman agora. The statue was damaged but restored. It may have been transported to Constantinople with the Chryselephantine statue of Zeus of Olympia where it could still have been in the 10th century CE. Another hypothesis is based on the presence of traces of a second base. The statue of Athena Parthenos could then have been replaced, at an indeterminate point in time. Until the edict of Theodosius in 380, the Parthenon retained its pagan religious role. It then seems to have experienced a more or less long period of abandonment. Somewhere between the fifth and the seventh century, the building was transformed into a church. Sources do not mention the statue at that time; it is therefore not possible to know if it had been destroyed or transported to Constantinople.

Antique copies and replicas

At least sixty-nine small-scale copies of the statue are known. Very early on, her influence was felt, sometimes very far away. Thus, gold medallions from a tomb in Kul-Oba (Crimea) and preserved in the Hermitage Museum, reproduce the head of the statue. During Roman times, small copies were mass-produced, sometimes simplifying the decor. The Athena of Varvákeion is one of the most famous examples. Sometimes, only the decoration was reproduced, mainly that of the outside of the shield, apparently in the form of decorative plates for export.

Among the most famous ancient copies are the Lenormant Athena and therefore the Athena of Varvakeion preserved in the National Archaeological Museum of Athens, the Minerva with the necklace of the Louvre Museum or a Roman copy signed Antiochos preserved at the Palazzo Altemps (Roman National Museum). A restoration was made by sculptor Pierre-Charles Simart between 1846 and 1855 for the Duke of Luynes. It is exhibited in its castle in Dampierre.

A life-size replica was made in 1990 for the Nashville Parthenon by American sculptor Alan LeQuire. On a steel and aluminium frame, a mixture of plaster and fibreglass was covered with 8 kg of gold leaf.

Notes

References

Bibliography

5th-century BC Greek sculptures
1990 sculptures
Parthenon
Culture of Nashville, Tennessee
Ivory works of art
Lost sculptures
Sculptures by Phidias
Sculptures of Athena
Ancient Greek and Roman colossal statues
Cult images